Brænne Mineralvatn was a small Norwegian bottling company established in 1915. They specialize in non-alcoholic drinks, chiefly carbonated soft drinks but also lemonade and mineral water. Brænne was among the last independent bottling companies in Norway. It shut down in 2010.

Their production facility was located between Ørsta and Volda, and their products where distributed mainly in the western part of Norway (Vestlandet). Brænne was the Norwegian manufacturer of R.C. Cola, a worldwide brand. They also cooperated with Lidl.

They had a large number of products, and their top sodas where:
R.C. Cola
Brus med pæresmak (green soda with pear taste)
Brus med Annanassmak (orange soda with pineapple taste)
Brus med sitronsmak (soda with a small taste of lemon)

External links
 Official site

Beer in Norway
Food and drink companies established in 1915
Companies based in Møre og Romsdal
Food and drink companies disestablished in 2010
2010 disestablishments in Norway
Norwegian companies established in 1915